was a town located in Nukata District, Aichi Prefecture, Japan.

As of 2003, the town had an estimated population of 9,307 and a population density of 58.07 persons per km². The total area was 160.27 km².

On January 1, 2006, Nukata was merged into the expanded city of Okazaki.

External links
 Okazaki official website 

Dissolved municipalities of Aichi Prefecture
Okazaki, Aichi